This is an alphabetical list of science fiction writers connected to Scotland by birth, death or long-term residence.

A

Gilbert Adair
Mea Allan
William Archer
Marion Arnott
Kate Atkinson
William Auld

B

Allan Baillie
 David Baillie
Andrew Balfour
Iain Banks
Robert Barr
Eric Temple Bell
Margot Bennett
Julie Bertagna
Chris Boyce
Christopher Brookmyre
George MacKay Brown
John Brunner
Jonathan Burke
Ron Butlin

C

J Storer Clouston
Michael Cobley
Arthur Conan Doyle
JJ Connington

D

Florence Dixie
Dougal Dixon
Diane Duane – resident in Scotland for a period
Robert Ellis Dudgeon
Dave Duncan
Hal Duncan

E
Margaret Elphinstone

F
Michel Faber – Dutch writer resident in Scotland; has used Scotland as a setting
Matthew Fitt

G

 Jonathan Gathorne-Hardy
 Lewis Grassic Gibbon
 Gary Gibson
 Richard Gordon
 Stuart Gordon
 Alan Grant
 John Grant
 Alasdair Gray
 Stephen Greenhorn
 Neil M Gunn
 Kenneth Sylvan Guthrie

H
 JBS Haldane
 Owen Hall
 Peter Hamilton
 Ronald Hingley

J
 William James
 Richard Jobson

K

 Chris Kelso
 James Kennaway
 Cam Kennedy
 Philip Kerr
 William King

L
Archibald Lamont
Alan W. Lear
David Lindsay
Eric Linklater
Duncan Lunan

M

 Stuart MacBride
 Hugh MacColl
 J. T. McIntosh (James Murdoch MacGregor)
 F. Gwynplaine MacIntyre
 Compton Mackenzie
 Alistair MacLean
 Ken MacLeod
 Graham McNeill
 Angus MacVicar
 Donald Malcolm
 Colin Manlove
 Bruce Marshall
 Troy Kennedy Martin
 David I. Masson
 Robert Duncan Milne
 William Minto
 Naomi Mitchison
 Steven Moffat
 Dan Morgan
 Grant Morrison
 Peter Morwood – resident in Scotland for a while

N
 Bill Napier
 Ian Niall (John McNeillie)
 Joseph Shield Nicholson
 Hume Nisbet
 Lisanne Norman

O

 Margaret Oliphant
 George Orwell – English writer of Scottish extraction; wrote Nineteen Eighty-Four while living in Isle of Jura
 Walter Owen

P
 James Peddie
 David Pringle

Q
Frank Quitely

R

 Hannu Rajaniemi – Finnish writer; long-term resident in Scotland
 Gordon Rennie
 Terence Roberts (Ivan T. Sanderson)
 Michael Scott Rohan
 Archie Roy
 Brian Ruckley

S

Ivan T. Sanderson (Terence Roberts)
 Graham Seton
 Michael Shea
 Catherine Helen Spence
 Gordon Stables
 Robert Louis Stevenson
 Charles Stross
Martin Swayne

T
 John Taine (Eric Temple Bell)
 Ismar Thiusen (John MacNie)
 Ruthven Todd

U
 Thomas Urquhart

W
 David Walker
 Irvine Welsh
 Gordon Williams

Y
 Jane Yolen – American writer; long-term resident of Scotland

See also

 List of science fiction writers
 List of Scottish writers

References

Footnotes

Online resources
 Books from Scotland, Scottish Science fiction
 SF Encyclopedia

Science fiction
Scottish